Karaidelsky (masculine), Karaidelskaya (feminine), or Karaidelskoye (neuter) may refer to:
Karaidelsky District, a district of the Republic of Bashkortostan, Russia
Karaidelsky, name of the village of Sosnovy Bor, Republic of Bashkortostan, Russia, until 2003